"Stellar" is a song by American rock band Incubus. It was released on June 13, 2000 as the second single from their third album Make Yourself. The song reached number 2 on the US Modern Rock Tracks and also reached number 17 on the US Mainstream Rock charts and number 7 on Bubbling Under Hot 100 Singles.

Music video
The music video released in 2000 has the band playing in a surreal, celestial atmosphere. A young woman (played by Brandon Boyd's then-girlfriend Jo) ends up traveling into space to meet Boyd. During the chorus, the band is seen playing in front of a white screen with floating lines and graphs spinning around in the background.

In other media
It is featured in the Daria movie Is It College Yet?.
Cover version is featured in Guitar Hero and as downloadable content for the Xbox 360 version of Guitar Hero II. 
Master recording is featured in Guitar Hero Smash Hits and downloadable content for Rocksmith and Rock Band.

Track listing
US Promo
 "Stellar (Radio Edit)"

US Single
 "Stellar" (Acoustic)
 "Stellar" (Album Version)

Charts

Personnel
Incubus
Brandon Boyd - vocals
Mike Einziger - guitar
Dirk Lance - bass
José Pasillas - drums
Chris Kilmore - turntables
Production
Produced by Scott Litt

References

2000 singles
Incubus (band) songs
Song recordings produced by Scott Litt
1999 songs
Epic Records singles
Songs written by Brandon Boyd
Songs written by Mike Einziger
Songs written by Alex Katunich
Songs written by Chris Kilmore
Songs written by José Pasillas
Music videos directed by Phil Harder